Ende is an Austronesian language spoken in the central part of Flores, one of the Lesser Sunda Islands in the eastern half of Indonesia. It belongs to the Central Flores subgroup.

Phonology

Grammar

Like all Central Flores languages, Ende has a highly isolating structure.

See also
Lio language
Ende Regency

References

Languages of Indonesia